The 1999–2000 snooker season was a series of snooker tournaments played between 23 July 1999 and 28 May 2000. The following table outlines the results for ranking events and the invitational events.


Calendar

Official rankings 

The top 16 of the world rankings, these players automatically played in the final rounds of the world ranking events and were invited for the Masters.

Notes

References

External links

1999
Season 2000
Season 1999